Critical Reviews in Physical and Rehabilitation Medicine is a quarterly scientific journal published by Begell House covering the field of physical medicine and rehabilitation. The editor-in-chief is Martin Grabois.

External links
 

Begell House academic journals
Quarterly journals
English-language journals
Physical medicine and rehabilitation journals
Review journals
Publications established in 1989